Tom Hudson is an American computer programmer best known for co-creating the 3D modeling and animation package 3D Studio (which became 3D Studio Max, then Autodesk 3ds Max) as well as creating its precursor, CAD-3D for the Atari ST.

He began his career as a technical editor and video game programmer for Atari 8-bit family magazine ANALOG Computing, where he wrote his first 3D rendering program. He left shortly after the introduction of the Atari ST in 1985 to write the bitmap paint program DEGAS. Hudson drew the sample images for DEGAS and created the animated short that shipped with 3D Studio.

Career

ANALOG Computing
From 1982 until 1985, Hudson was a technical editor for Atari 8-bit computer magazine ANALOG Computing. While at ANALOG, he wrote a number of machine language games printed as type-in programs, including Fill 'er Up (based on Qix), Livewire! (based on Tempest), Retrofire, Planetary Defense (co-written with Charles Bachand), and Fire Bug (co-written with Kyle Peacock). All games were accompanied by the assembly language source code. From issues 13 through 40, Hudson wrote a 6502 tutorial column called "Boot Camp."

In 1982, Hudson developed Buried Bucks (stylized as Buried Buck$), an action game sold commercially by the magazine under the name ANALOG Software. Buried Bucks was licensed to Imagic which re-released it in 1984 as Chopper Hunt. In ANALOG Computing issue 8, Hudson presented a program called Graphic Violence! which creates visuals similar to the expanding explosions in Atari's 1980 Missile Command arcade game. That effect is used in both Buried Bucks and Planetary Defense.

In 1984 he wrote a 3D object viewer called Solid States for the Atari 8-bit line, published in ANALOG #16. The Atari BASIC program lets the user enter a series of 3D points, then a series of lines connecting them, and displays the result as a wireframe. The objects themselves are created on graph paper.

Atari ST and beyond
Hudson left ANALOG when the Atari ST was introduced in 1985 and developed the paint program DEGAS published by Batteries Included the same year. He created an enhanced version, DEGAS Elite, released in 1987.

After DEGAS, Hudson wrote CAD-3D for the Atari ST, published by Antic Software (run by Gary Yost), which was later renamed Cyber Studio. CAD-3D started as a port of Solid States to the Atari ST. Hudson abandoned the Atari ST when expected improvements in the hardware did not occur. Working with Yost, Jack Powell, and Dan Silva, "The Yost Group" developed 3D Studio for MS-DOS-based IBM PC compatibles which was published in 1990 by Autodesk. The animated short Cornerstone, which shipped with 3D Studio, was created by Hudson.

Return to games
Under the name ANALOG Retro, Hudson teamed up with former magazine staffers Lee Pappas and Jon Bell to write the Star Raiders-inspired Star Rangers for iOS. The game is no longer available.

In 2012, Hudson enhanced his Atari 8-bit Planetary Defense game to take advantage of modern emulators. Planetary Defense 2012 was announced in the AtariAge forums on September 2, 2012.

Software
Atari 8-bit games
 Buried Bucks (1982), later released as Chopper Hunt
 Fill 'Er Up
 Livewire!
 Retrofire
 Planetary Defense, with Charles Bachand
 Fire Bug, with Kyle Peacock
 Adventure at Vandenberg AFB, text adventure
 Planetary Defense 2012

Atari 8-bit non-game software
 Solid States (1984), 3D object viewer
 HBUG: Hudson's Debugging Utility (1984), machine code monitor

Atari ST
 DEGAS (1985)
 DEGAS Elite (1986)
 CAD-3D (1986)

MS-DOS
 3D Studio (1990), with Gary Yost, Dan Silva, and others

iOS
 Star Rangers (2010)

References

External links
 klanky.com Tom Hudson's website.

American computer programmers
Video game programmers
Living people
Computer graphics researchers
Year of birth missing (living people)